Emetophilia, also known as Roman shower, is the sexual arousal from vomiting, being vomited on or watching others vomit. It is sometimes referred to as vomit fetish, and the fetish is considered a paraphilia.

See also
 Emetophobia

References

Further reading
 

Paraphilias
Vomiting